The Paul F. Forman Team Engineering Excellence Award was first introduced as the Engineering Excellence Award by the Optical Society in 1989 and was awarded individually, or shared among individuals.  In 2007 it was named in honor of Paul F. Forman. This award recognizes technical achievements in optical engineering as well as contributions to society such as engineering education. It award is sponsored by Zygo Corporation, Canon Inc, Optical Solutions Group at Synopsys, Cambridge Research & Instrumentation, and several individual contributors.

List of winners
Source: The Optical Society
 2020 2-Photon Optical Clock Collaboration
2019 Headwall Photonics, Inc., Special Projects Team
 2018 Adaptive Optics Facility on the Very Large Telescope (VLT) at European Southern Observatory’s Paranal Observatory
 2017 Guide Star Alliance
 2016 Advanced LIGO Engineering Team
 2015 Logic Analysis Tool Team (LAT Team)
 2014 	Intel® Silicon Photonics Solutions Group
 2013 	ZygoLOT Automotive Precision Optical Team
 2012 	Georgia Tech Research Institute (GTRI) Lidar Team
 2011 	Tomasz S. Tkaczyk
 2010 	Alan E. Willner
 2009 	Stephen A. Boppart
 2008 	Michael J. Bechtold
 2007 	Ming C. Wu
 2006 	Jean-Claude Diels
 2005 	René-Jean Essiambre
 2005  Michael G. Littman
 2004 	Shun-Lien Chuang, S. Chandrasekhar
 2003 	L. Ramdas Ram-Mohan, Paul R. Dumas, Mark E. Lowry, Alan H. Gnauck
 2002 	Tim Day, Christopher R. Doerr, David W. Peckham
 2001 	Henry A. Blauvelt, Michael A. Klug, David G. Mehuys, Dale E. Morton
 2000 	  	  	J. W. Anello, Jr., A. Erstling, A. C. Tam, R. L. Hartman, L. J. P. Ketelsen, J. A. Grenko, W-T. Tzang
 1999 	  	  	Denis Barbier, Valentin Gapontsev, Igor Koltchanov, Olaf Lenzmann, Herman Reedy
 1998 	  	  	Lee R. Shiozawa, Kenneth L. Walker
 1997 	  	  	Donald M. Combs, John J. Mader, Jeffrey W. Roblee, Edward A. Yobaccio, Paul R. Yoder, Jr.
 1996 	  	  	Gary Blough, Teddi C. Laurin
 1995 	  	  	Francisco J. Duarte, John D. Gonglewski, Gary Guenther, Melvyn H. Kreitzer, Frank Luecke, David G. Voelz
 1994 	  	  	Peter P. Clark, Dale E. Crane, Jay M. Eastman, John Michael Guerra, Jon Van Tassell
 1993 	  	  	J. H. Adams, L. G. Cook, G. Duplain, Y. P. Khimich, S. V. Lubarsky, F. R. Nash, P. Parayanthal, D. A. Roberts
 1992 	  	  	Bertrand H. Johnson, Louis A. Koszi, Anthony R. Phillips, Jr.
 1991 	  	  	Leroy D. Dickson, J. Tendra S. Goela, Un-Chul Paek, Michael A. Pickering, Raymond L. Taylor
 1990 	  	  	Lawrence Lin, Eric Rawson
 1989 	  	  	Stanley W. Haskell, Robert A. Jones, David Smithgall, Gary Starkweather, Laurence S. Watkins

See also

 List of engineering awards
 List of physics awards

References

Engineering awards
Awards of Optica (society)